Diederichs is a German surname. Notable people with the surname include:

Eugen Diederichs (1867–1930), German publisher
Georg Diederichs (1900–1983), German politician
Klaus Diederichs, English banker
Nico Diederichs (1903–1978), South African politician
Otto von Diederichs (1843–1918), Imperial German Navy admiral

See also
Helene Voigt-Diederichs (1875–1961), German writer
Diederich

German-language surnames